Avdotyino is a rural locality (a village) in Domodedovo District of Domodedovsky District, Moscow Oblast, Russia. The population was 152 as of 2010. There are 15 streets.

Geography 
Avdotyino is located 5 km southwest of Domodedovo (the district's administrative centre) by road. Domodedovo is the nearest rural locality.

References 

Rural localities in Moscow Oblast